Musa Gilaniyevich Evloev (born 31 March 1993) is a Russian Greco-Roman wrestler. He won the gold medal in the 97 kg event at the 2020 Summer Olympics held in Tokyo, Japan. He is also a two-time world champion and two-time national champion, having won in 2016 and 2017. Internationally, Evloev won silver at the 2017 World Wrestling Championships in Paris, France, losing to Artur Aleksanyan from Armenia. That year he also won the 2017 Wrestling World Cup in Tehran, Iran.

He won the 2018 World Wrestling Championships, now in the 97 kg division, defeating Bulgarian Kiril Milov, 7–2 and at the 2019 World Wrestling Championships he won gold medal again, in the final match he beat Artur Aleksanyan.

In 2020, he won the gold medal in the 97 kg event at the Individual Wrestling World Cup held in Belgrade, Serbia. In 2021, he won the gold medal in the men's 97 kg event at the Matteo Pellicone Ranking Series 2021 held in Rome, Italy.

References

External links
 
 
 

1993 births
Living people
Russian male sport wrestlers
World Wrestling Championships medalists
European Wrestling Championships medalists
Wrestlers at the 2020 Summer Olympics
Medalists at the 2020 Summer Olympics
Olympic medalists in wrestling
Olympic gold medalists for the Russian Olympic Committee athletes
European Wrestling Champions
Olympic wrestlers of Russia
20th-century Russian people
21st-century Russian people